Glibovac is a village located in the municipality of Smederevska Palanka in the Podunavlje district of Serbia. According to the census of 2002, Glibovac has 2269 inhabitants.

History

The name of Glibovac originates from the Serbian word for mud.
The first written mention of Glibovac was in 1784 by an Austrian spy crossing the area. Though it likely that there was a settlement there before that time as some medieval remains were found in the vicinity.
In 1919 archaeologists from the Art History Archive in Belgrade discovered remains of an ancient Roman town on the site of the current village. In a field near the hamlet of Bubanj 375 were found coins dating from the reigns of Septimius Severus (193-211AD) and Volusianus (251-253AD).
A primary school was first opened in 1891

Geography

Glibovac is situated about 4 km from the centre of Smederevska Palanka along the railway going north towards Smederevo and Belgrade. The village is divided into two parts Gornji Glibovac (Upper) and Donji Glibovac (lower).
It is also sometimes called Salevac, the name of the small area between in the rivers that form the Mali Lug and Kubršnica

Demography

The adult population living in Glibovac in 1829, and the average age of the population is 40.7 years (40.0 for men and 41.4 for women). The village has 639 households. The average number of members per household is 3.55.
According to the 2002 census, this village is mainly populated Serbs.

Graph of population changes during the 20th century

Ethnic make up according to the census of (2002)

Famous residents

The most well known of the villager is probably Stanoje Glavaš (1763–1815), a Serbian Hajduk, who was a hero of the first and second Serbian uprising against the Ottoman Empire, and was killed by the Turks in 1815 in the village of Baničina near Glibovac.

Konstrakta, who represented Serbia in  Eurovision Song Contest 2022 in Turin. Her father's side of the family has origin from Glibovac.

Culture

Every early August since 2005, Glibovac has organized a cultural and sporting event known as Dani Stanoja Glavaša, the "Days of Stanoje Glavaš. There is a competition and the winner is crowned harambaše (outlaw leader).

See also
List of places in Serbia
Smederevska Palanka
Stanoje Glavaš

References

External links
History of Glibovac in Serbian
 Satellite view of Glibovac

Populated places in Podunavlje District